The British Virgin Islands competed at the 2004 Summer Olympics in Athens, Greece, from 13 to 29 August 2004. This was the nation's sixth appearance at the Summer Olympics since its debut in the 1984 Summer Olympics. The British Virgin Islands delegation included only one athlete, meaning the country, along with Brunei and Liechtenstein, sent the lowest number of athletes to the 2004 Summer Games. The athlete selected was sprinter Dion Crabbe, an athlete who qualified for the Olympics by meeting the "A" standard time required for his event, the men's 200 meters. Crabbe was also selected as flag bearer for the opening ceremony. He did not progress beyond the heats, meaning the British Virgin Islands won no medals at this Summer Olympics.

Background
The British Virgin Islands participated in six Summer Olympic games between its debut in the 1984 Summer Olympics in Los Angeles, United States and the 2004 Summer Olympics in Athens. The British Virgin Islands National Olympic Committee (NOC) selected one athlete to represent the country, Dion Crabbe, as he had qualified for the men's 200 meters after meeting the "A" standard required for the event. Sending only one athlete to the Athens Games meant that the country, along with Brunei and Liechtenstein, sent the lowest number of athletes to the 2004 Summer Games. Crabbe was also selected as flag bearer for the opening ceremony. Two officials represented the country, including chef de mission Dean Greenaway.

Athletics 

Making his Summer Olympic debut, Dion Crabbe qualified for the men's 200 meters, after his best time, 20.30 seconds in 2002, was 0.29 seconds faster than the "A" standard required. He was also notable for holding the British Virgin Islands flag at the opening ceremony. He competed on 24 August in the Men's 200 meters against seven other athletes in the fifth heat. He ran a time of 20.85 seconds, finishing sixth. He ranked ahead of Malaysia's Nazmizan Muhammad (21.24 seconds) and behind Czech Republic's Jirí Vojtík (20.79 seconds), in a heat led by Bahamas' Dominic Demeritte (20.62 seconds). Overall, Crabbe placed 33rd out of the 55 athletes that competed and was 0.07 seconds behind the slowest athlete that progressed to the next round. Therefore, that was the end of his competition.

Men

Notes

References

Nations at the 2004 Summer Olympics
2004
Olympics